This is a list of longest prison sentences served by a single person, worldwide, without a period of freedom followed by a second conviction. These cases rarely coincide with the longest prison sentences given, because some countries have laws that do not allow sentences without parole or for convicts to remain in prison beyond a given number of years (regardless of their original conviction).

Longest sentences served

More than 70 years

60–69 years

50–59 years

40–49 years

Longest spells in solitary confinement
The sentence duration refers to the time spent in solitary confinement, regardless of time spent in normal prison before or after. Death row prisoners, who are usually also held in isolation, are not included.

More than 40 years

30–39 years

20–29 years

10–19 years

Longest spells on death row
These prisoners were sentenced to death rather than prison, but their execution was stalled for a prolonged time due to different reasons.

More than 40 years

30–39 years

See also
List of longest prison sentences
List of prisoners with whole-life tariffs
Blanche Monnier, a French woman who was locked alone in a small room by her own family for 25 years

References

Other sources
 . Lists the lengthiest sentences actually completed, with detailed case studies.

Lists of prisoners and detainees
Prisoners sentenced to life imprisonment
Penal imprisonment
Life imprisonment
Prison sentences served